Wicked is a cast recording containing the majority of the songs from the Tony Award-winning Broadway musical Wicked, with music and lyrics by composer Stephen Schwartz and a book by writer Winnie Holzman. Released on December 16, 2003 by Decca Broadway both in physical and digital releases. The former contains a foreword and a short synopsis, provided by Gregory Maguire, who wrote the 1995 novel on which the musical is based, in addition to lyrics to those songs included.

Composer and lyricist of Wicked, Stephen Schwartz, produced the album aided by Frank Filipetti, Jill Dell'Abate, Jason Spears, Justin Shturtz, Jason Stasium and Ted Jensen. The original cast album of Wicked was recorded on November 10, 2003, with the full cast and orchestra, at then-Right Track Studios and mastered at Sterling Sound in New York City.

The cast recording has received positive reviews and has received substantial commercial success. It received the 2005 Grammy Award for Best Musical Show Album in 2005 and although initially peaking at number 125 on the Billboard 200 in 2003, has since reached the new peak of 66 in 2013. The album was certified platinum on November 30, 2006 by the RIAA, but has since been certified double platinum, four years later, on November 8, 2010.  It has sold 2,670,000 copies in the U.S. as of January 2017.

Track listing

Notes
The reprise of "No One Mourns the Wicked" is attached to the beginning of "Thank Goodness".
"The Wicked Witch of the East", sung by Nessarose, Elphaba, and Boq, is missing from the album. Producers deemed it too difficult to arrange for the album and thought the song would give too much of the plot away to an audience who had never seen Wicked before.
Short reprises of "The Wizard and I" and "A Sentimental Man", that appear in Act I and II respectively, are not included. This is mainly because they are not technically considered full musical numbers.

Fifth anniversary special edition 

A fifth anniversary special edition of the original Broadway cast recording was released on October 28, 2008, with a bonus CD including tracks "Dancing Through Life", "Popular", "As Long As You're Mine" and "No Good Deed" from the Japanese and German cast recordings of Wicked, "I'm Not That Girl" by Kerry Ellis, "Making Good" – a song that never made the final show – by Stephanie J. Block, Menzel's dance mix of "Defying Gravity" and "For Good" sung by LeAnn Rimes and Delta Goodrem.

Track listing

Deluxe edition 

The set of two CDs included new deluxe packaging featuring the show's tenth anniversary artwork, and a booklet with new essays by composer and lyricist Stephen Schwartz, and Gregory Maguire, the author of Wicked: The Life and Times of the Wicked Witch of the West, the novel on which the musical is based.

Track listing

German language recording

In 2007, the original Stuttgart cast rerecorded the Wicked album in German, ahead of the opening of the German production in Stuttgart that year. The title of this album was Wicked Das Musical - Die Hexen von Oz.  The German lyrics are by Michael Kunze and German dialogue by Ruth Deny, conducted by Sebastian de Domenico.  The orchestral music conducted by Stephen Oremus and has identical musician credits—presumably the cast simply sung to the original orchestral recording.

Personnel

Cast
Willemijn Verkaik – Elphaba
Lucy Scherer – Galinda, later Glinda
Mark Seibert – Fiyero
Carlo Lauber – Der Zauberer von Oz
Angelika Wedekind – Madame Akaber
Nicole Radeschnig – Nessarose
Stefan Stara – Moq
Michael Günther – Dr. Dillamonth

Alternates
Sabrina Weckerlin – Elphaba
Jana Stelley – Glinda

Ensemble vocals
Cosimo de Bartolomeo
Paul Boereboom
Alan Byland
Heather Carino
Alessandro Cococcia
Ben Cox
Matthias Dressel
Belinda Jean Edwards
Marco Fahrland
Rhys George
Maria Graciano
Sam Hale
Kisha Howard
Emma Hunter
Michael Kargus
Jessica Lantto
Jimmy Laremore
Valerie Link
Artur Molin
Jens Simon Petersen
Stefan Poslovski
Rey Rodriguez
Barbara Schmid
Lanie Sumalinog
Maike Switzer
Francesca Taverni
Roberta Valentini

15th anniversary special edition 

The album was re-released on February 8, 2019, with four bonus tracks. These tracks were taken from live performances on the show A Very Wicked Halloween: Celebrating 15 Years On Broadway, which was broadcast by NBC on October 29, 2018.

Track listing

Singles
In 2007, Idina Menzel re-recorded "Defying Gravity" as a solo version and released it as a single.

Kerry Ellis recorded rock versions of the songs "Defying Gravity" and "I'm Not That Girl" for her 2008 album Wicked in Rock, produced by Queen's guitarist, Brian May.

Julia Murney recorded "I'm Not That Girl" for her album, I'm Not Waiting (2006). She recorded this particular song because she deemed it one song of the entire musical "that had nothing to do with flying or wizards".

Charts

Year-end charts

Certifications

References

2003 soundtrack albums
Cast recordings
Decca Records soundtracks
Musicals based on The Wizard of Oz
The Wicked Years
Theatre soundtracks